Catoptria bolivari is a species of moth in the family Crambidae described by Ramón Agenjo Cecilia in 1947. It is found in the Pyrenees of France and Spain.

References

Moths described in 1947
Crambini
Moths of Europe